Kurzyniec Lock, Kuzhyniec Lock - fifteenth lock on the Augustów Canal (from the Biebrza) in the administrative district of Gmina Płaska, within Augustów County, Podlaskie Voivodeship, in north-eastern Poland, and the border with Belarus runs down the center line of the lock. The Polish-Belarus border runs along the axis and this lock on the canal for a length of 3.5 km.

Sluice is situated near the village of Rudawka. Lock construction began in 1828 cf. Eng. Constantine Jodko and ended in 1829 noted. Eng. F. Wielhorski. The name comes from the former village of Kurzyniec that used to be sited on both sides of the canal. 

The lock has been closed since 1939, but under an agreement between the Government of the Polish Republic and the Government of the Republic of Belarus contained in Augustów on 8 March 2005 on the reconstruction of the canal section of the border has been the ongoing renovations since fall of 2006 to June 2007.

The edges of the lock drawbridge connects with four concrete pillars. During the summer there is open border crossing to do.

Specifications

 Location: 81.75 km channel
 Level difference: 2.98 m
 Length: 44.6 m
 Width: 6 m
 Gates: Wooden
 Year of construction: 1828-1829
 Construction Manager: Konstantin Jodko, F. Wielhorski

Notes

References
 
 
 

1820s establishments in Poland
19th-century establishments in Belarus
Locks of Belarus
Locks of Poland